Oecanthus celerinictus, the fast-calling tree cricket, is a species of tree cricket in the family Gryllidae. It is found in North America.

References

celerinictus
Articles created by Qbugbot
Insects described in 1963
Orthoptera of North America